KGCE-LP is a low power FM radio station broadcasting a Reformed Christian radio format branded as Grace Radio from Modesto, California. KGCE airs local preaching broadcasts from Grace Church of Modesto as well as music from artists such as Shane & Shane, Ellie Holcomb, and Sovereign Grace Music.

On September 16, 2016, KGCE-LP was granted a Federal Communications Commission construction permit to move its antenna 125 feet west northwest of the current location. Effective radiated power will remain 100 watts and the height above average terrain will increase to 25.1 meters.

History
KGCE-LP began broadcasting on February 20, 2014.

References

External links
 

Modesto, California
Radio stations established in 2015
2015 establishments in California
GCE-LP